Fernbank may refer to:

Australia
 Fernbank, Victoria
 Fernbank railway station, Victoria

Canada
 Fernbank, Ontario a proposed community near Ottawa, Ontario.
 Fernbank Road in Ottawa, Ontario.

United States

 Fernbank, Alabama
 Fernbank Park, Cincinnati, Ohio
Fernbank was the estate of Col. Z. D. Harrison in DeKalb County, Georgia.  Following his death in 1938, it was preserved and devoted to educational purposes. It lends its name to the following:
 Fernbank Elementary School
 Fernbank Forest
 Fernbank Museum of Natural History
 Fernbank Observatory
 Fernbank Science Center